Lee In-bok (born 30 March 1984) is a South Korean biathlete.

He competed in the Winter Olympics for South Korea. His best performance was 65th, in the sprint. He also finished 71st in the individual.

As of February 2013, his best performance at the Biathlon World Championships, is 19th, in the 2008 and 2009 mixed relays. His best individual performance is 72nd, in the 2008 and 2013 individual races.

As of February 2013, his best Biathlon World Cup finish is 14th, as part of the Korean mixed relay team at Pyeongchang in 2007/08. His best individual finish is 53rd, in the individual at Hochfilzen in 2008/09.

References 

1984 births
Biathletes at the 2010 Winter Olympics
Biathletes at the 2014 Winter Olympics
South Korean male biathletes
Living people
Olympic biathletes of South Korea
Sportspeople from North Jeolla Province
Biathletes at the 2007 Asian Winter Games
Biathletes at the 2011 Asian Winter Games
Biathletes at the 2017 Asian Winter Games
20th-century South Korean people
21st-century South Korean people